The Fejér Megyei Eötvös József Szakképző Iskola és Kollégium is a secondary school in Seregélyes, Hungary.

References 

Secondary schools in Hungary
Fejér County